Gordon Harris (11 December 1897 – 30 June 1974) was an Australian cricketer. He played in 37 first-class matches for South Australia between 1920 and 1931.

See also
 List of South Australian representative cricketers

References

External links
 

1897 births
1974 deaths
Australian cricketers
South Australia cricketers
Cricketers from Adelaide